Tiger Rose is a 1929 American Pre-Code early sound adventure film produced and distributed by Warner Bros. It was directed by George Fitzmaurice and is based on a 1917 play, Tiger Rose, by Willard Mack. This film is a remake of the 1923 film Tiger Rose Warner Bros. silent that starred Lenore Ulric, who also starred on Broadway in Mack's play. Among the cast members in this film are Monte Blue, Lupe Vélez and Rin Tin Tin.

Both adaptations 1923 and 1929 exist. Library of Congress has an incomplete copy. A 16mm copy is housed at the Wisconsin Center for Film & Theater Research.

Plot
A mountie pursues a man wanted for murder.

Cast
Monte Blue as Devlin
Lupe Vélez as Rose
H. B. Warner as Dr. Cusick
Tully Marshall as Hector McCollins
Grant Withers as Bruce
Gaston Glass as Pierre
Bull Montana as Joe
Rin Tin Tin as Scotty
Slim Summerville as Heine
Louis Mercier as Frenchie
Gordon Magee as Hainey
Heinie Conklin as Gus
Leslie Sketchley as Mounted police officer
Fred MacMurray as a Rancher (non credited)

References

External links

lobby poster of the film
8-by-10 still of Lupe Vélez, H.B. Warner and Monte Blue(archived)

1929 films
American films based on plays
Warner Bros. films
Films directed by George Fitzmaurice
1929 adventure films
American adventure films
American black-and-white films
Remakes of American films
Sound film remakes of silent films
Lost American films
Rin Tin Tin
1920s American films
1920s English-language films